Pralognan-la-Vanoise or simply Pralognan is an alpine commune in the Savoie department in the Auvergne-Rhône-Alpes region in Southeastern France. In 2019, it had a population of 715. The commune is located within Vanoise National Park.

The Patinoire olympique was the curling venue for the 1992 Winter Olympics hosted in Albertville and surroundings in the French Alps.

Geography

Climate

Pralognan-la-Vanoise has a humid continental climate (Köppen climate classification Dfb).

See also
Communes of the Savoie department

References

External links
Official site
Cycling up to Pralognan-Les Prioux: data, profile, map, photos and description

Venues of the 1992 Winter Olympics
Communes of Savoie
Sports venues in Savoie